Songs from the Underground - EP is the first compilation album by American rock band Linkin Park, released in November 28, 2008.

Background 
The album features songs previously released through the Linkin Park Underground fan club, as well as two previously unreleased live tracks from Projekt Revolution 2008. "And One" and "Part of Me" were included in the Hybrid Theory (EP) (the band's debut EP), "Dedicated" was a demo originally released on LP Underground 2.0. "Sold My Soul to Yo Mama" (a track made by Linkin Park turntablist and sampler player Joe Hahn, and guitarist/keyboardist/vocalist Mike Shinoda, which includes samples from songs "Points of Authority" and "Papercut"), was released exclusively for LP Underground 4.0. "Announcement Service Public" and "QWERTY" are found in the LP Underground 6.0. "Hunger Strike", a song by Temple of the Dog, was performed by its lead singer Chris Cornell (whom the band toured with), and features a surprise guest appearance by Linkin Park lead vocalist Chester Bennington.

Inside the physical CD, a leaflet can be found, inside which includes a free trial for a membership at LP Underground, as well as a limited free download of a live version of "Crawling", featuring Chris Cornell.

Track listing

Charts

See also
Linkin Park discography

References

2008 albums
Albums produced by Mike Shinoda
Warner Records albums
Linkin Park albums